The Legend of Yeti Gonzales is the debut studio album by the band Yeti.

Track listing
 "Obviously"
 "Don't Go Back to the One You Love"
 "Till the Weekend Comes"
 "Merry Go Round"
 "In Like with You"
 "Shane MacGowan"
 "Midnight Flight"
 "Jermyn Girls"
 "Never Lose Your Sense of Wonder"
 "Reprise"
 "Can't Pretend"
 "Sister Sister"
 "Last Time You Go"
 "Who Is Gonzales?"

References

2008 albums
Yeti (band) albums